Russia competes at the 2009 World Championships in Athletics from 15–23 August. A team of over 100 athletes was announced in preparation for the competition, one of the largest squads in the competition. Selected athletes have achieved one of the competition's qualifying standards. Yelena Isinbayeva, Tatyana Lebedeva, Yekaterina Volkova, and Olga Kaniskina are the defending champions in their respective events. The 2008 Olympic champion Valeriy Borchin, and world record holder Gulnara Galkina-Samitova, are also competing. Russia will be represented in all the women's events, and furthermore, only five men's events will not feature a Russian competitor.

Team selection

Track and road events

Field and combined events

References

External links
Official competition website

Russia
World Championships in Athletics
2009